Beyond the Horizon is a play written by American playwright Eugene O'Neill. Although he first copyrighted the text in June 1918, O'Neill continued to revise the play throughout the rehearsals for its 1920 premiere. His first full-length work to be staged, Beyond the Horizon won the 1920 Pulitzer Prize for Drama.

Productions
Beyond the Horizon premiered on Broadway at the Morosco Theatre, from February 3, 1920 to February 20, 1920, transferred to the Criterion Theatre from February 24, 1920 to March 5, 1920, and finally transferred to the Little Theatre, from March 9, 1920 to June 26, 1920. Directed by Homer Saint-Gaudens, the cast featured Erville Alderson (James Mayo), Richard Bennett (Robert Mayo), Robert Kelly (Andrew Mayo), Mary Jeffery (Kate Mayo), and Sidney Macy (Captain Dick Scott).

This production won the 1920 Pulitzer Prize for Drama.

Beyond the Horizon was revived on Broadway at the Mansfield Theatre on November 30, 1926 and closed on February 5, 1927 after 79 performances. Directed by James Light, the cast featured Malcolm Williams (James Mayo), Judith Lowry (Kate Mayo), Albert Tavernier (Captain Dick Scott), Thomas Chalmers (Andrew Mayo), Robert Keith (Robert Mayo), Aline MacMahon (Ruth Atkins), Eleanor Wesselhoeft (Mrs. Atkins), and Elaine Koch (Mary).

The play was presented by Royal & Derngate in Northampton in November 2009. This production subsequently transferred to London's National Theatre in March 2010.

Overview
The play takes place on a farm in the Spring, and then moves forward three years later, in the Summer, and finally five years later, in late Fall. The play focuses on the portrait of a family, and particularly only two brothers Andrew and Robert. In the first act of the play, Robert is about to go off to sea with their uncle Dick, a sea captain, while Andrew looks forward to marrying his sweetheart Ruth and working on the family farm as he starts a family.

Adaptations
The play was adapted for television and broadcast on PBS Great Performances series in July 1975, directed by Rick Hauser and Michael Kahn. The cast featured Richard Backus (Robert Mayo), Kate Wilkinson (Kate Mayo), John Randolph (James Mayo), Edward J. Moore (Andrew Mayo), Maria Tucci (Ruth Atkins), Geraldine Fitzgerald (Mrs. Atkins), John Houseman (Dr. Fawcett), and James Broderick (Captain Scott). The play was adapted into an opera by composer Nicolas Flagello in 1983.

Critical response
According to the PBS American Experience program, "Theater historians point to O'Neill's Beyond the Horizon, which debuted in 1920, as the first native American tragedy. That play emerged from O'Neill's association with the Provincetown Players, one of many so-called 'little theaters' that developed in the 1910s to provide alternative fare to commercial drama of the time."

References

External links
 
 
 

1920 plays
Broadway plays
Pulitzer Prize for Drama-winning works
Tragedy plays